William Pilkington may refer to:

 Liam Pilkington (1894–1977), also known as William or Billy, served in the Irish Republican Army during the Irish War of Independence
 William Pilkington (architect) (1758–1848), English architect
 William Pilkington (cricketer) (1806–1832), English cricketer
 Harry Pilkington (William Henry Pilkington, 1905–1983), glass manufacturer
 Sir William Pilkington, 8th Baronet (1775–1850), of the Pilkington baronets
 Sir William Milborne-Swinnerton-Pilkington, 10th Baronet (1831–1855), of the Pilkington baronets